The 1969 Hardy Cup was the 1969 edition of the Canadian intermediate senior ice hockey championship.

Final
Best of 5
La Tuque 8 Lloydminster 3
La Tuque 8 Lloydminster 5
La Tuque 7 Lloydminster 3

La Tuque Wolves beat Lloydminster Border Kings 3–0 on series.

Eastern Playdowns

Teams
Northern Ontario - Kapuskasing GMs
Ontario - Port Colborne Sailors
Ottawa - Shawville Pontiacs
Quebec - La Tuque Wolves
Maritimes - St. John Merchants
Newfoundland - St. John's

Playdowns

Western Playdowns

Teams
British Columbia - Powell River Regals
Alberta - Lloydminster Border Kings
Saskatchewan - Kindersley Klippers
Thunder Bay - Fort Frances Canadians

Playdowns

External links
Hockey Canada

Hardy Cup
Hard